Daniel Nestor and Nenad Zimonjić were the defending champions, but lost in the second round to Simon Aspelin and Paul Hanley.

Wesley Moodie and Mikhail Youzhny won in the final 6–4, 4–6, [10–6], against Marcelo Melo and André Sá.

Seeds
All seeds receive a bye into the second round.

Draw

Finals

Top half

Bottom half

External links
 Main draw

Doubles